Barrington is a station on Metra's Union Pacific Northwest Line located in Barrington, Illinois. Barrington has two tracks and two side platforms; it is the southernmost station on the Union Pacific Northwest Line without a third express track, which begins about a quarter mile southeast of the station near Baker Lake. It is also the last station outbound within Cook County. A station house where tickets may be purchased is on the inbound platform. Parking is available at the station.

As of April 25, 2022, Barrington is served by 53 trains (26 inbound, 27 outbound) on weekdays, by 33 trains (16 inbound, all 17 outbound) on Saturdays, and by 20 trains (nine inbound, all 11 outbound) on Sundays.

On weekdays, two inbound trains originate, and two outbound trains terminate, at Barrington. On Saturdays, one inbound train originates, and two outbound trains terminate, at Barrington.

History 
The current station moved from its previous location near the Ice House Mall in 1977, in order to reduce the amount of time traffic on Main Street would need to wait for trains to pass through. The old station had six staff across three shifts, whilst the new station had two staff and two shifts until 1995, when it reduced to just one staff member.

References

External links
Metra - Barrington Station 

Metra stations in Illinois
Buildings and structures in Barrington, Illinois
Former Chicago and North Western Railway stations
Railway stations in Lake County, Illinois
Railway stations in the United States opened in 1977